Mugo is a name of Kenyan origin that may refer to:

Mugo Gatheru (born 1925), Kenyan author on colonial Kenya
Mugo Kibiru, 19th century Kenyan prophet from the Kikuyu tribe
Beth Wambui Mugo (born 1939), Kenyan politician and Member of Parliament for the Party of National Unity
Hellen Mugo (born 1985), Kenyan marathon runner and 2012 Košice Peace Marathon winner
Micere Githae Mugo (born 1942), Kenyan writer, academic and social activist
Naomi Mugo (born 1977), Kenyan middle-distance runner and two-time African champion
Samuel Muturi Mugo (born 1985), Kenyan marathon runner and winner of the 2009 Beijing Marathon
Stanley Mugo Mwaura (nickname-Washukalli) (born 1954). Kenyan educationist who initiated largescale ECDE teacher training (1981) together with Kenya YMCA.

See also
Mugo, Korean court dance

Kenyan names